Pleurostylia is a small genus of shrubs in the family Celastraceae containing 
13 described species. Of these 3 are accepted species names.

Species
Accepted species in this genus:
Pleurostylia africana Loes. 
Pleurostylia capensis Oliv.  
Pleurostylia opposita (Wall.) Alston (from Sri Lanka to Philippines & Australia, Mozambique)

Unresolved species of this genus:
Pleurostylia heynei  Wight & Arn.
Pleurostylia leucocarpa   Baker
Pleurostylia pachyphloea  Tul. (endemic to La Réunion)
Pleurostylia serrulata  Loes. (endemic to Cameroon)

References

External links
The International Plant Names Index
Chinese Flora

Celastraceae
Celastrales genera